Star Quest 1 in the 27th century is a 3D space combat and flight simulator video game for DOS developed by Virtual Adventures Inc. in 1995.

Gameplay

The player takes the role of a volunteer pilot and completes various missions which include direct fighting, protecting ally ships and surface structures, commanding wingman attack formations, and participating in friendly space races against other pilots. As the player completes more missions, ship upgrades (like better engines and weapons) become available, and new missions are unlocked.

Development

The game was developed by Virtual Adventures Inc., a Canadian developer. It was founded in November 1994, headquartered in Quebec, Canada with a vision to build itself as an independent video games developer company since its establishment and to be popular to the game lovers.

A sequel, to be titled Star Quest 2: United Galaxies, was being developed, and planned to feature 3D real-time strategic multiplayer action. A Kickstarter campaign was launched to fund the development of the sequel, but was unsuccessful in reaching its goal. Only $1,167 out of $22,448 was pledged to the Kickstarter, leading to the end of the sequel's campaign on December 26, 2013.

Reception
The game received generally favorable reviews from contemporary publications. PC Answers rated the game 73%, criticizing the lack of innovation and its "horrendous techno music", but nonetheless saying it is "an enjoyable shooter with a good variety of missions". Atout Micro, a Quebec-based publication, reviewed the game and concluded it was "a nice local product".

Star Quest 1 was included on PC Gamess August 1996 demo CD. The game was consistently ranked amongst the "Top 40 Most Popular Games in the World" throughout 1996, as published by PC Games Chart.

References

External links 
 Official game page
 Star Quest in the 27th Century in Amazon.com- ASIN: B00069KY8S

1995 video games
DOS games
DOS-only games
Space flight simulator games
Video games developed in Canada